Yelena Volkova (Елена Юрьевна Волкова), born 27 May 1968, is a former swimmer from the Soviet Union who won the gold medal in the 200 meters breaststroke at the 1991 World Aquatics Championships in Perth, Australia. She represented the Soviet Union at the  1988 Olympics where she finished 5th in the 100 meters breaststroke, and the Unified Team at the 1992 Olympics.

Personal life

Volkova's husband Gennadiy Prigoda was also an Olympic swimmer. Elena Volkova and Gennadiy Prigoda has a son named Kirill Prigoda, who competed in the men's 100 metre breaststroke event at the 2016 Summer Olympics.

References

External links
Yelena VOLKOVA at the-sports.org

1968 births
Living people
Russian female breaststroke swimmers
Soviet female breaststroke swimmers
Swimmers at the 1988 Summer Olympics
Swimmers at the 1992 Summer Olympics
World Aquatics Championships medalists in swimming
European Aquatics Championships medalists in swimming
Olympic swimmers of the Soviet Union
Olympic swimmers of the Unified Team
Universiade medalists in swimming
Place of birth missing (living people)
Universiade silver medalists for the Soviet Union
Universiade bronze medalists for the Soviet Union
Medalists at the 1991 Summer Universiade
Medalists at the 1993 Summer Universiade